Sudeepana Banakar Prabhudeva (born 13 January 1994), popularly known by her stage name Aditi Prabhudeva, is an Indian actress who predominantly appears in Kannada cinema.

Personal life
Aditi born as Sudeepana Banakar Prabhudeva on born 13 January 1994 in Davanagere, Karnataka.
Aditi marries Coorg based businessman Yashas Patla on 28 November 2022 in Bangalore Palace ground.

Filmography

Television

References

External links
 
 
 
 

Actresses in Kannada television
Actresses in Kannada cinema
People from Davanagere
Actresses from Karnataka
Living people
1990 births